Manny Wilkins Jr. (born November 5, 1995) is an American football quarterback for the St. Louis BattleHawks of the XFL. He played college football for Arizona State. After going undrafted in the 2019 NFL Draft he signed with the Green Bay Packers of the National Football League (NFL).

Early years
When Wilkins was 16, he was identified as a talented prospect.

Wilkins's father, Manny Wilkins Sr., died when Manny was 10 years old in 2006. Wilkins relocated to Texas with his mother in 2008, where he played football at Elkins High School. He relocated back to California to live with his aunt and uncle and started at quarterback while attending San Marin High School in Novato, California.

College career
Wilkins came to Arizona State as one of the most prolific quarterback prospects in Arizona State history. After redshirting his first season, and only appearing in three games in his redshirt freshman campaign, Wilkins won the starting quarterback position, beating out fellow highly-touted prospect, Brady White.

Wilkins redshirted his first year and didn't see game action.

In 2015, Wilkins saw limited game action, Wilkins did not throw a pass, but had 7 rushing attempts for 55 yards.

As a sophomore, Wilkins started 10 games beating out Brady White for the starting job in training camp. Wilkins finished the season with 197 completions for 311 attempts for 2329 yards and 12 touchdowns with 9 interceptions. Wilkins also had 128 rushing attempts for 246 yards and 5 touchdowns.

As a junior, Wilkins started all 13 games and had 260 completions on 410 attempts for 3270 yards and 20 touchdowns and 8 interceptions. Wilkins rushed on 138 attempts for 282 yards and 7 touchdowns.

As a senior, Wilkins started all 13 games and had 247 completions and 393 attempts. He threw for 3025 yards for 20 touchdowns and 6 interceptions. Wilkins also rushed on 112 attempts for 452 yards and 8 touchdowns.

Professional career

Green Bay Packers 
Wilkins signed with the Green Bay Packers as an undrafted free agent on May 3, 2019. He was waived on August 31, 2019, and was signed to the practice squad the next day. He signed a reserve/future contract with the Packers on January 21, 2020.

He was released by the Packers on April 27, 2020.

St. Louis BattleHawks 
On February 12, 2023, Wilkins signed with the St. Louis BattleHawks of the XFL.

References

External links

1995 births
Living people
African-American players of American football
People from Novato, California
Players of American football from California
Sportspeople from the San Francisco Bay Area
American football quarterbacks
Arizona State Sun Devils football players
Green Bay Packers players
21st-century African-American sportspeople